Liblín is a market town in Rokycany District in the Plzeň Region of the Czech Republic. It has about 300 inhabitants.

Notable people
Charles Pergler (1882–1954), diplomat and lawyer

References

Populated places in Rokycany District
Market towns in the Czech Republic